The Last Pirates (original title: Gli ultimi filibustieri ) is an adventure novel written by Italian author Emilio Salgari, published in 1908. It is the final book in Salgari's popular The Black Corsair series.

Plot summary

The Last Pirates follows Countess Ines di Ventimiglia, the daughter of the Red Corsair, as she goes back to Panama to claim her inheritance as granddaughter of the Cacique of Darien. The Marquis de Montelimar, however, eager to marry her and put his hands on the inheritance decides to kidnap her. It's up to Mendoza, Buttafuoco and don Barrejo to free her, which they do with the help of another pirate, Raveneau de Lussan. Once they finish the rescue, they depart with a ship full of gold and retire to live in peace.

Film adaptation
Two film adaptations were made of The Last Pirates,  Gli ultimi filibustieri, in 1921 by Vitale De Stefano, and Gli ultimi filibustieri in 1943 by Marco Elter.

See also
The Black Corsair
The Queen of the Caribbean
Son of the Red Corsair
Sandokan series
The Mystery of the Black Jungle
The Tigers of Mompracem
The Pirates of Malaysia
The Two Tigers
The King of the Sea
Quest for a Throne

1908 novels
Novels by Emilio Salgari
Italian novels adapted into films